Protein-L-isoaspartate (D-aspartate) O-methyltransferase domain containing 1 is a protein that in humans is encoded by the PCMTD1 gene.

References

Further reading